Lion is a British drama film, directed by Simon P. Edwards. The film stars Ian Virgo, Nicola Posener, Jessica-Jane Stafford and Marlon Blue.

Plot

Cast
 Ian Virgo as Adam Westfield
 Nicola Posener as Miljiana
 Jessica-Jane Clement as Freya Westfield
 Marlon Blue as Frank Stanford 
 Kaylee Rose as Sophie Westfield
 Mark Ivan Benfield as Bus Driver
 David Blood as Man at Zoo
 Danny Cotton as Man exiting the Bus
 Bruce Duthie as Office Worker
 Shane Finn as Man at Bus
 Felicity Kate Greef as Office Worker
 Jack W. Gregory as Man on Bus
 Nakita Harden as Women on Bus
 Sam Hoggarth as Man on Street
 Alexander Parnell as Jensen Matthews
 Lindy Pierri as Women at Bus Stop
 David Smith as Man on Bus
 Corinne Tuddenham-Trett as Office Worker
 Mark Adrian Ward as Man on Bus

Filming locations
Filming took place at Colchester Zoo, Colchester, Essex, England and in Norwich, Norfolk, England, UK.

Release 
The film was released on 16 August 2023.

References

External links 
 

2010s English-language films